Rigoletto  is an 1851 opera in three acts by Giuseppe Verdi.

Rigoletto may also refer to:
 Rigoletto (1918 film), an Austrian silent historical film
 Rigoletto (1956 film), an Italian musical melodrama film 
 Rigoletto (1982 film), an Italian opera film
 Rigoletto (1993 film), a musical fantasy/drama

See also
 Giuseppe Verdi's Rigoletto Story, a 2002 film version of the opera
 Rigoletto... in Bluegrass, a 2006 Canadian film